Tigrane Pasha ( (Dikran) (d. 27 July 1904, Evian-les-Bains) was an Egyptian-Armenian politician and the ninth Foreign Minister of Egypt. He served as Foreign Minister from 1891 to 1894, under three Prime Ministers.

Career 
Tigrane was a nephew of the powerful statesman Nubar Pasha. He received a European education, and was less than fluent in Arabic and Turkish. In 1865, his uncle appointed him to the railway administration. In 1878, he was secretary general of the Council of Ministers during his uncle's first term as prime minister.

References 

Egyptian people of Armenian descent
Foreign ministers of Egypt
19th-century Egyptian people
Armenians from the Ottoman Empire